Stryker Corporation is an American multinational medical technologies corporation based in Kalamazoo, Michigan. Stryker's products include implants used in joint replacement and trauma surgeries; surgical equipment and surgical navigation systems; endoscopic and communications systems; patient handling and emergency medical equipment; neurosurgical, neurovascular and spinal devices; as well as other medical device products used in a variety of medical specialties.

In the United States, most of Stryker's products are marketed directly to doctors, hospitals and other healthcare facilities. Internationally, Stryker products are sold in over 100 countries through company-owned sales subsidiaries and branches as well as third-party dealers and distributors.

Business segments
Stryker segregates their reporting into three reportable business segments: Orthopedics, Medical and Surgical (MedSurg), and Neurotechnology and Spine.

 Orthopedics products consist primarily of implants used in hip and knee joint replacements and trauma and extremities surgeries.
 MedSurg products include surgical equipment and surgical navigation systems (Instruments); endoscopic and communications systems (Endoscopy); patient handling and emergency medical equipment (Medical); and reprocessed and remanufactured medical devices as well as other medical device products used in a variety of medical specialties. 
 Stryker Neurotechnology and Spine products include a portfolio of products including both neurosurgical and neurovascular devices. Their neurotechnology offering includes products used for minimally invasive endovascular techniques, as well as a line of products for traditional brain and open skull base surgical procedures, orthobiologic and biosurgery products including synthetic bone grafts and vertebral augmentation products, as well as minimally invasive products for the treatment of acute ischemic and hemorrhagic stroke. Stryker also develops, manufactures and markets spinal implant products including cervical, thoracolumbar and interbody systems used in spinal injury, deformity and degenerative therapies.

History
The Orthopedic Frame Company, the precursor of Stryker Corporation, was formed in 1941 by Dr. Homer Stryker, a Kalamazoo, Michigan, orthopedist and a 1925 graduate of the University of Michigan Medical School . Stryker developed the Turning Frame, a mobile hospital bed that allowed for repositioning of injured patients while providing necessary body immobility; the cast cutter, a cast cutting apparatus that removed cast material without damaging underlying tissues; and the walking heel, among others. In 1964, the company name was officially changed to Stryker Corporation.

In 1979, Stryker made an initial public offering of stock and later acquired Osteonics Corporation, entering the replacement hip, knee, and other orthopedic implants market (Stryker). In 1999 annual sales reached $2.1 billion, and in 2000 Stryker was included in the S&P 500 and the Forbes Platinum 400 for the first time. In 2002 sales reached $3.0 billion and Stryker was listed in the Fortune 500 for the first time.

In 2003, Stephen P. MacMillan joined Stryker as president and CEO. In 2005, annual sales reached $4.9 billion and John W. Brown transitioned to the single role of chairman of the board, a role he retired from in 2010, while MacMillan became president and CEO. By 2007, Stryker sold its Physiotherapy Associates division to private equity firm Water Street Healthcare Partners for $150 million. In February 2012, Mr. MacMillan resigned and Curt R. Hartman was named Interim Chief Executive Officer and vice president and chief financial officer. Mr. William U. Parfet was named non-executive chairman of the board. On October 1, 2012, Mr. Kevin A. Lobo was appointed as president and chief executive officer.

At the end of 2012, Stryker had approximately 22,000 global employees and annual sales of $8.7 billion. 35% of those sales were outside the U.S.

In a 2012 global market overview of top medical technology firms, Stryker was ranked number 10 with total portfolio sales in excess of $8.6 billion.   Moreover, the firm maintains 35% worldwide reconstructive market share; 50% worldwide MedSurg market share; 15% worldwide Neurotechnology and Spine market share.

The company was recognized by Hermann Simon as a role model for other small to medium-sized business in his book Hidden Champions. Stryker recently hired former Johnson & Johnson executive Rob Fletcher as its new chief legal officer.

John Brown 
Brown served as president, CEO and finally chairman of the board across a 32-year career with Stryker. One report attributes Stryker's rise from a maker of hospital beds to a world-class medical technology company to Brown.

Corporate governance
As of 2018, members of the board of directors of Stryker Corporation are:
Kevin A. Lobo, chairman and CEO
Allan C. Golston, lead independent director
Mary K. Brainerd
Srikant M. Datar, Ph.D.
Dr. Roch Doliveux, DVM
Louise L. Francesconi
Sherilyn S. McCoy
Andrew K. Silvernail
Ronda E. Stryker
Rajeev Suri
John W. Brown, chairman emeritus
Howard E. Cox, Jr, director emeritus

Recent acquisitions

1998–2010
In 1998, Stryker purchased Howmedica, the orthopaedic division of Pfizer, for $1.65 billion.  Howmedica became Stryker Orthopaedics. In August 2000, Stryker acquired, with stock, Guided Technologies, a developer and manufacturer of optical localizers purposed for use in healthcare and industrial.

In August 2004, Stryker acquired, for $120 million, SpineCore, a company involved in the development of artificial spinal disks. About two years preceding this date, in June 2002, the firm acquired the Spinal Implant Business of Surgical Dynamics for $135 million.

In March 2006, Stryker absorbed the Haifa, Israel-based Sightline Technologies into its operations. Sightline, a manufacturer of gastrointestinal endoscopy apparatuses, propelled Stryker into the flexible endoscopy market. In February of the same year, the firm acquired eTrauma.com, a privately held entity involved in the development of software for Picture archiving and communication system (PACS); the company was incorporated into Stryker Endoscopy Business. December 2005 marked the company's acquisition of PlasmaSol Corp. for $17.5 million. PlasmaSol produces technologies allowing sterilization of various MedSurg equipments.

In 2009, Stryker acquired Ascent Healthcare Solutions the market leader in the reprocessing and remanufacturing of medical devices in the U.S.

2011–today
In January 2011, Stryker acquired the Neurovascular Division of Boston Scientific, which includes products used for the minimally invasive treatment of hemorrhagic and ischemic stroke. In June 2011, Stryker purchased Malvern, Pennsylvania-based Orthovita, a biomaterials company specializing in bone augmentation and substitution technologies.  The Orthovita business now makes up the Stryker Orthobiologics division, which specializes in biomaterials for all Stryker divisions. In July 2011, Stryker completed the acquisition of privately held Memometal Technologies S.A..  France based Memometal develops, manufactures and markets products for extremity indications based on its proprietary methods for preparing and manufacturing a shape memory metal alloy. In August 2011, Stryker signed a definitive agreement to acquire privately held Concentric Medical, Inc. in an all-cash transaction for $135 million. Concentric's products include devices for the removal of thrombus in patients experiencing acute ischemic stroke along with a broad range of AIS access products.
 
In November 2012, Stryker acquired the Tel Aviv, Israel-based Surpass Medical Ltd., a company developing a flow diversion stent technology to treat brain aneurysms using a mesh design and delivery system, for $135 million.

In March 2013, Stryker acquired Trauson Holdings Company Limited. Trauson is a trauma manufacturer in China and a major competitor in the spine segment. In December 2013, Stryker acquired MAKO Surgical Corporation. MAKO is a company in South Florida that manufactures and markets surgical robotic arm assistance platforms, most notably the RIO (Robotic Arm Interactive Orthopedic System) as well as orthopedic implants used by orthopedic surgeons for use in partial knee and total hip arthroplasty. Stryker also acquired Patient Safety Technologies, Inc. The company offers Safety-Sponge System, an integrated counting and documentation system that prevents surgical sponges and towels from being unintentionally left in patients after surgical procedures.

In March 2014, Stryker acquired Pivot Medical, Inc. Pivot is a privately held business selling innovative products for hip arthroscopy with operating facilities in Sunnyvale, CA. In April 2014 Stryker acquires Berchtold Holding AG (Berchtold), a provider of customer-centric healthcare equipment for over 90 years. Berchtold's product portfolio includes surgical tables, equipment booms, and surgical lighting systems geared towards maximizing efficiency and safety in operating rooms and ICUs. On July 1, 2014, Stryker Corp. announced that it had agreed to buy the assets of Small Bone Innovations Inc., a Morrisville, Pa.-based company that specializes in products that help surgeons treat and replace small bones and joints for $358 million. The company also acquired Patient Safety Technologies for $120 million.

In September 2015,  Stryker acquired Turkish company Muka Metal A.S. which is manufacturing hospital beds and patient furniture in Kayseri.

In February 2016, the company announced it would acquire Sage Products for $2.8 billion. Later in the same month the company announced the acquisition of Physio-Control from Bain Capital Outline of the Northern Mariana Islands Equity for $1.28 billion.

In June 2017, Stryker acquired Arthrogenx, LLC, which developed the Cobra reusable suture passer for arthroscopic rotator cuff repair  and Novadaq. In September, Stryker completed its acquisition of Novadaq Technologies for $700 million. In October, the company acquired Vexim for €183 million. In November 2017 the company announced it would acquire Entellus Medical Inc $662 million, bolstering Strykers ENT business.

In 2018 Stryker acquired K2M Group Holdings, Inc., producer of complex spine and minimally invasive technology. In May the business acquired Hygia Health, Services SafeAir AG, HyperBranch Medical Technology, Inc.,
and Invuity, Inc.

In February 2019 the company announced it would acquire Arrinex, Inc. manufacturer of cryoablation technology for the treatment of chronic rhinitis. In March Stryker acquired the Israeli-based OrthoSpace, Ltd for up to $220 million.  In October, the business acquired Mobius Imaging, LLC and GYS Tech, LLC (DBA Cardan Robotics). In November of the same year the company announced it would acquire Wright Medical Group N.V. for around $4 billion ($5.4 billion including debt), expanding into upper-body implants.

In January 2021, Stryker announced it would acquire joint replacement technology business, OrthoSensor, Inc. In May 2021, Stryker announced the acquisition of TMJ Concepts.

In January 2022, the company announced it would acquire digital care business Vocera Communications for around $3 billion.

Acquisition history

Stryker Corporation (Est. 1941 as The Orthopedic Frame Company)
Osteonics Corporation
Howmedica (Acq 1998)
Leibinger GmbH(Acq 1996)
Guided Technologies, Inc. (Sold 2007, SpineCore Inc.)
Water Street Healthcare Partners (Sold 2007)
Surgical Dynamics Inc. (Acq 2002)
SpineCore Inc. (Acq 2004)
PlasmaSol Corporation (Acq 2005)
Sightline Technologies Ltd (Acq 2006)
eTrauma.com Corporation (Acq 2006)
Ascent Healthcare Solutions, Inc. (Acq 2009)
Boston Scientific (Neurovascular div) (Acq 2011)
Orthovita (Acq 2011)
Memometal Technologies S.A. (Acq 2011)
Concentric Medical, Inc. (Acq 2011) 
Trauson Holdings Company Limited (Acq 2012)
MAKO Surgical Corporation (Acq 2012)
Patient Safety Technologies (Acq 2012)
Surpass Medical Ltd (Acq 2012)
Pivot Medical, Inc. (Acq 2014)
Berchtold Holding AG (Acq 2014)
Small Bone Innovations Inc. (Acq 2014)
Sage Products (Acq 2016)
Physio-Control (Acq 2016)
Stanmore Implants Worldwide Ltd (Acq 2016)
Entellus Medical Inc (Acq 2017)
Arthrogenx, LLC (Acq 2017)
Novadaq (Acq 2017)
Vexim (Acq 2017)
Scopis GmbH (Acq 2017)
K2M Group Holdings, Inc. (Acq 2018)
Hygia Health Services (Acq 2018)
SafeAir AG (Acq 2018)
HyperBranch Medical Technology, Inc. (Acq 2018)
Invuity, Inc (Acq 2018)
Arrinex, Inc. (Acq 2019)
OrthoSpace, Ltd (Acq 2019)
GYS Tech, LLC (Acq 2019)
Mobius Imaging, LLC (Acq 2019)
Stryker B.V.
Stryker Unite, (Bermuda) Ltd
Wright Medical Group N.V. (Acq 2019)
Wright Luxembourg S.A.
Wright Medical (Bermuda) Ltd 
IMASCAP SAS (Acq 2017)
Cartiva, Inc. (Acq 2018)
OrthoSensor, Inc. (Acq 2020)
TMJ Concepts (Acq 2020)
Vocera Communications (Acq 2021)

Controversies & Lawsuits
On January 27, 2000, Stryker Corporation restated its operating results for the year ended December 31, 1998, to reduce acquisition-related charges by $30.9 million.

Since early 2007, the company has received three warning letters from the Food & Drug Administration citing issues in compliancy. The first of these, a seven-page correspondence, named various issues at an Irish manufacturing facility, such as untimely fix of failures and procedural noncompliance in the testing of failed or otherwise problem-prone devices. The second, sent November 2007, cites issues at the firm's Mahwah, New Jersey, facility, including poor fixation of hip implant components, in some instances requiring mitigation by revision surgeries; exceeded microbial level violations in the cleaning and final packaging areas of the sterile implants; and failure to institute measures in prevention of recurrence of these and other problems. The final warning letter, sent April 2008, cites issues at the firm's Hopkinton, MA biotechnology facility.  Again, issues relate to quality and noncompliance including falsification of documents relevant to the selling of products to hospitals which are to be sold under a limited, government-mandated basis. Stryker maintains that employees involved in the falsification of documents have since been terminated.

In the fall of 2007, Stryker, along with the related companies Biomet, Zimmer Holdings, DePuy Orthopaedics and Smith & Nephew, were involved in civil litigation with the U.S. Department of Health and Human Services, Office of Inspector General. This litigation called for a net payout of $311 million as the governmental department maintains the aforementioned companies engaged in unlawful kickbacks to physicians who urged hospitals to purchase their respective products. Stryker, however, having cooperated early in the investigation, was not fined.

As of February 2008, a dispute exists between Stryker Corp. and the U.S. Department of Justice concerning a subpoena linking the company to aforementioned misconduct in sale of products.  Since governmental filing of the injunction, Stryker notes that it has produced in excess of 300,000 pages of documentation in compliance with the mandate.  U.S. Government counters, however, that the documentation was not proper in scope and format. Law officials expect the investigation to continue for several months.

Stryker recalled several models of medical vacuums sold under the Neptune Waste Management System brand in June and September 2012. The devices, some of which had not been cleared by the Food and Drug Administration, caused a fatal accident when the vacuum was mistakenly used to suction a passive drainage tube.

Lawsuits
On 2012, FDA has issued a warning for the Stryker Rejuvenate hip replacement after it was discovered that the hip replacement was considered defective and can cause similar side effects to DePuy Hip Implants. As a results, on 2014, Stryker was fined 1 billion and 2.5 billion for their defective Rejuvenate and ABG II hip replacement that can cause excruciating pain.

Response to 2022 Russian invasion of Ukraine
During the 2022 Russian invasion of Ukraine, Stryker was among those that continued business-as-usual in Russia rather than join the more than a thousand international corporations that have curtailed operations there. Research from Yale School of Management evaluating companies' reaction to the Russian invasion put Stryker in the "Grade F" category of "Digging In", meaning "Defying Demands for Exit or Reduction of Activities."[Original research?]

References

External links

 

American companies established in 1941
Health care companies established in 1941
Companies listed on the New York Stock Exchange
Manufacturing companies based in Kalamazoo, Michigan
1941 establishments in Michigan
Health care companies based in Michigan
Medical technology companies of the United States
Medical device manufacturers
1970s initial public offerings